The 2012 mid-year rugby union tests (also known as the Summer Internationals in the Northern Hemisphere) refer to the rugby union Internationals that were played through June, mostly in the Southern Hemisphere.

These matches marked the start of a global rugby calendar established by the International Rugby Board (IRB), which runs until 2019. The calendar includes a return of traditional tours by European teams, in which a team plays multiple Tests against a southern hemisphere side, often with mid-week matches against provincial or regional sides. This year, all three of the teams that competed in the Rugby Championship's predecessor tournament, the Tri Nations, hosted European nations in three-Test series. Australia hosted Wales, marking the first three-Test series in Australia by a top European side since the British & Irish Lions' 2001 tour. South Africa hosted England for three Tests, the first extended tour of that country by a single nation since New Zealand toured in 1996.

The new calendar also provided expanded Test opportunities for so-called "Tier 2" nations. As part of this IRB initiative, another tradition returned – tours of the Pacific Islands by major nations. Scotland became the first Tier 1 nation to play a Test in the Pacific Islands since 2006, visiting Fiji and Samoa. Also, Italy toured the Americas, claiming wins over Canada and the United States and a loss to Argentina.

Overview

Series

Other tours

Fixtures

Week 1

 As per tradition, the Barbarians' side featured uncapped players: Jérôme Fillol, Ernst Joubert and Anton van Zyl.

Week 2

 Contrary to tradition, the Barbarians side did not feature any uncapped players.

 The Welsh Rugby Union announced that this would be a fully capped match. As a result, Martyn Williams became the third Welsh player with 100 caps when he came off the bench. It was also announced that this match would be the last international appearance of Martyn Williams and Wales top try-scorer Shane Williams.
 Four players made their full international debuts for Wales: Rhodri Jones, Harry Robinson, Liam Williams and Adam Warren.

Week 3

 Scotland claimed their first win in Australia since 1982.
 Six players made their full international debut for Australia: Dan Palmer, Dave Dennis, Michael Hooper, Mike Harris, Joe Tomane and Luke Morahan.
 Two players made their full international debut for Scotland: Ryan Grant and Tom Brown.

 Three players made their full international debut for New Zealand: Brodie Retallick, Julian Savea and Aaron Smith.
 Three players made their full international debut for Ireland: Simon Zebo, Declan Fitzpatrick and Ronan Loughney.

 Cooper Vuna (Australia) and Ashley Beck (Wales) made their full international debuts.

 Four players made their full international debut for South Africa: Marcell Coetzee, Eben Etzebeth, Juandré Kruger and Coenie Oosthuizen.
 Three players made their full international debut for England: Tom Johnson, Joe Marler and Jonathan Joseph

 Tomas Cubelli, Ignacio Mieres, Manuel Montero, Bruno Postiglioni and Joaquin Tuculet made their full international debuts for Argentina.
 Alberto de Marchi made his full international debut for Italy.

Week 4

 This was Ireland's first test match in Christchurch.

 Tim Visser made his debut for Scotland, only four days after becoming eligible by completing three years' residency.

 Brice Dulin, Romain Taofifenua, Christopher Tolofua and Yvan Watremez made their full international debuts for France in this match.
 Rodrigo Baez made his full international debut for Argentina in this match.

 Three players made their full international debuts for the USA: Derek Asbun, Shaun Davies, and Tolifili Liufau.

Week 5

 This match was the first ever encounter between Japan and the French Barbarians. (Both teams had however played twice against each other in Sevens tournaments, at the Hong Kong Sevens in 1987 and at the Air France Sevens in 1999, the Baa-Baas claiming both victories.)
 Pierre Bernard, Hugo Bonneval (following in his father Eric's footsteps), Henry Chavancy, Ibrahim Diarra, Thierry Lacrampe, Camille Lopez, Romain Millo-Chluski, Marvin O'Connor, Rabah Slimani and captain William Servat all made their debuts in the blue-striped shirt.

 Originally, New Zealand referee Chris Pollock was meant to referee this match, but due to injury, Jaco Peyper of South Africa was the referee. He also refereed both the Australia and the Fiji games.
 It was announced 50 minutes before kick-off that Nick De Luca was out of the match due to a thigh strain, and would be replaced by Joe Ansbro.

 New Zealand captain Richie McCaw picked up his 94th Test victory, breaking the all-time record he previously shared with Australia's George Gregan.

 Facundo Barrea made his full international debut for Argentina in this match.
 Maxime Machenaud and Christophe Samson made their full international debuts for France in this match.
 France won by a margin of 39 points, the biggest margin of victory for either side in matches between Argentina and France.

 It was announced several minutes before kick-off that Chauncey O'Toole was out injured and Nanyak Dala had replaced him.

 Pierrick Gunther, Jean-Marc Mazzonetto and Ollie Phillips made their debuts for the French Barbarians.

See also
Mid-year rugby union test series
2012 Asian Five Nations
2012 IRB Pacific Nations Cup
2012 IRB Nations Cup
2012 Ireland rugby union tour of New Zealand
2012 France rugby union tour of Argentina
2012 England rugby union tour of South Africa
2012 Scotland rugby union tour of Australasia
2012 France rugby union tour of Argentina

References

External links
 http://news.bbc.co.uk/sport1/hi/rugby_union/welsh/3194026.stm 

2012
2011–12 in European rugby union
2011–12 in Japanese rugby union
2012 in Oceanian rugby union
2012 in North American rugby union
2012 in South American rugby union
2012 in South African rugby union